The Treaty of Sablé (also known as the Treaty of Verger or the Treaty of Le Verger) was signed on 20 August 1488 in Sablé between Duke Francis II of Brittany and Anne of France.  A year after the signing of Sable the treaty was reneged upon in favour of a tripartite alliance at Amiens with Burgundy and England. The town of Sable was therefore chosen for a summit in 1488 when the duchy was forced to do homage to the King of France for the last time.  The duchy was later merged into the kingdom.  The Duke who under the terms of the treaty, was integrated a member of the French nobility, died on 9 September 1488.  

Based on the terms of the accord, the Duke of Brittany acknowledged himself as a vassal of the King of France. Moreover, the Duke of Brittany pledged the territories of Saint Malo, Dinan, Fougères and Saint-Aubin-du-Cormier to be controlled by the French crown. Also, Francis promised to remove all foreign troops from his territories, as well as ensure to seek Charles's consent before marrying off his daughter, Anne. In return, Charles removed his forces from Brittany except in the town garrisons of the territories pledged by Francis.<ref>Fisher, p. 29. On August 20, [1488] a treaty was signed at Sablé between Francis and Charles. The Duke of Brittany acknowledged himself a vassal of the French crown; he placed St. Malo, Dinan, Fougères, and St. Aubin du Cormier in the hands of the French king as pledges; he promised to expel the foreign troops; he promised that Anne should not be married without Charles's consent. The French king in return for these concessions engaged to withdraw his army, saving the garrisons necessary to hold the towns which had been given him in pledge.  </ref> In another aspect of the treaty, the Duke of Brittany was no longer permitted to summon any troops from England.

Notes

References

Sources
George Lillie Craik and Charles MacFarlane. The Pictorial History of England: Being a History of the People, as Well as a History of the Kingdom. Charles Knight and Company, 1841 (Original from the New York Public Library).
Herbert Albert Laurens Fisher. The History of England, from the Accession of Henry VII, to the Death of Henry VIII, 1485-1547'' (Volume V). Longmans, Green, and Co., 1906.

External links
Encyclopædia Britannica - Treaty of Le Verger (France 1488)
WHKMLA - Franco-Breton War, 1487-1488

Legal history of France
Political history of France
1488 in Europe
1480s in France
1480s treaties
Sable